Data based decision making or data driven decision making refers to educator’s  ongoing process of collecting and analyzing different types of data, including demographic, student achievement test, satisfaction, process data to guide decisions towards improvement of educational process. DDDM becomes more important in education since federal and state test-based  accountability policies. No Child Left Behind Act opens broader opportunities and incentives in using data by educational organizations by requiring schools and districts to analyze additional components of data, as well as pressing them to increase student test scores. Information makes schools accountable for year by year improvement various student groups. DDDM helps to recognize the problem and who is affected by the problem.

Purpose

The purpose of DDDM is to help educators, schools, districts, and states to use information they have to actionable knowledge to improve student outcomes. DDDM requires high-quality data and possibly technical assistance; otherwise, data can misinform and lead to unreliable inferences. Data management techniques can improve teaching and learning in schools. Test scores are used by many principals to identify “bubble kids”, students whose results are just below proficiency level in reading and mathematics.

Types of data used in education

There are 4 major types of data used in education: demographics data, perceptions data, student learning data, and school processes data.

1. Demographics data in educational organizations answers the question, "Who are we?". Demographics show the current context of the school and shows the trends. Trends help to predict and plan for the future, along with seeing measures where leaders work towards continuous school improvement. Thorough demographic data explains the structure of school, system, and the leadership. In education demographic data to the next items: number of students in the school, number of students with special needs, number of English learners, age or grade of students in cohorts, socio-economical status of students, attendance rates, ethnicity/race/religious beliefs, graduation rates, dropout rates, experience information of teachers, information about parents of students.

2. Perception data tells us what students, staff, and parents think about a school and answers the question, "How do we do business?". School culture, climate, and organizational processes are assessed by perception data. Perception data includes values, beliefs, perceptions, opinions, observations. Perception data is collected mostly questionnaires. Perception data can be differentiate by two groups: 1- staff, 2 - students and parents. Staff are being asked if any changes in instruction or curriculum need to take place. Students and parents are questioned to report their interests, how difficult material is to learn, how are they taught and treated.

3. Student learning data answers two questions: How are our students doing? and Where are we now? Student learning data requires information from all subject areas, disaggregated by demographic groups, by teachers, by grade level, by cohorts over time, and individual student growth. This type of data helps to address additional help to students who are not proficient, deepening into what they know and what they don't know to become proficient. Student learning data connects with curriculum, instruction, and assessment in order to improve outcomes. Student learning data can clearly state the effectiveness of a single educator or the entire school. SLD can be gathered by looking at diagnostic tests, formative assessments, performance assessments, standardized tests, non-referenced tests, summative assessments, teacher-assigned tests, and others.

4. School processes refer to actions of administrators and teachers to achieve the purpose of the school. Teachers' habits, customs, knowledge, and professionalism are the things leading towards progress inside organizations. School processes data tell us what works, what doesn't, the results of educational process, and answers the question, "What are our processes?". School processes produce school and class results. There are 4 major types of school processes: 1. instructional processes, 2. Organizational processes, 3. Administrative processes, 4. Continuous school improvement processes.

Use in educational organizations

The U.S. Department of Education and the Institute of Education Sciences require to use data and DDDM in past decades to run educational organizations. Hard evidence and the use of data are emphasized to inform decisions. The data in educational organizations means more than analyzing test scores. Educational data movement is considered as a sociotechnical revolution. Educational data systems involve technologies and evidence to explain districts', schools', classrooms' tendencies. DDDM is used to explain complexity of education, support collaboration, creating new designs of teaching. Student performance is central in DDDM. NCLB provided boost in the collection and use of educational information.

For example, in a rural area educators tried to understand why a particular subset of students were struggling academically. Data analysts collected students performance data, medical records, behavioral data, attendance, and other data less qualitative information. After not finding direct correlation between collected data and student outcomes they decided to include transportation data into the research. As result, educators found that students who had longer way from houses to the school were struggling the most. According to the finding administrators modified transportation arrangements to make the way shorter for students as well as installing Internet access in buses so students could concentrate on doing homework. DDDM in this particular case helped to improve student results.

Effects on schools

Effective schools showing outstanding gains in academic measures report that the wide and wise use of data has a positive effect on student achievement and progress. DDDM is suggested to be a main tool to move educational organizations towards school improvement and educator effectiveness. Data can be used to measure growth over time, program evaluation along with identifying root causes of problems connected to education. Involving school teachers in data inquiry causes more collaborative work from staff. Data provides increasing communication and knowledge which has a positive effect on altering educator attitudes towards groups inside schools which are underperforming

Notes

General references
 
 

Data management
Standards-based education